Henry Lutz Cake (October 6, 1827 – August 26, 1899) was a Republican member of the U.S. House of Representatives from Pennsylvania.

Early life
Henry L. Cake was born near Northumberland, Pennsylvania.  He attended the common and private schools.  He learned the art of printing, and published the Pottsville Mining Record until the American Civil War.

American Civil War
Cake entered the Union Army on April 17, 1861, as a second lieutenant, and was elected colonel of the 25th Pennsylvania Infantry Regiment, in Washington, D.C., on May 1, 1861. He reorganized the regiment after three months’ service. He commanded the 96th Pennsylvania Infantry Regiment from September 23, 1861, to March 12, 1863, when he resigned and settled in Tamaqua, Schuylkill County, Pennsylvania.

Post-war life
 Following his resignation from the military, Cake engaged in the mining and shipping of anthracite coal.

United States House of Representatives
Cake was elected as a Republican to the Fortieth and Forty-first Congresses. He served as chairman of the United States House Committee on Accounts during the Forty-first Congress. He was an unsuccessful candidate for renomination in 1870.

Return to the coal industry
Following his service in the U.S. House of Representatives, Cake resumed the mining and shipping of coal.

Death and interment
He died in Northumberland, Pennsylvania in 1899, and was interred in the Riverview Cemetery.

See also

 History of coal mining in the United States

References

External links
 Downey, Brian, et al. "Henry Lutz Cake." Florida: Antietam on the Web, retrieved online February 23, 2019.
 "Henry Lutz Cake" (memorial with photo of gravestone). Salt Lake City, Utah: Find A Grave, retrieved online February 23, 2019.

People from Tamaqua, Pennsylvania
Union Army colonels
1827 births
1899 deaths
Republican Party members of the United States House of Representatives from Pennsylvania
19th-century American politicians
Military personnel from Pennsylvania